Adolf (Aatto) Suppanen (born 15 April 1855 in then-Finnish Ruskeala, d. 3 February 1898 in Helsinki) was a Finnish writer, journalist and translator. He used the nom de plume of Aatto S.

By the late 1800s Suppanen had become a prolific translator into Finnish, primarily from Swedish and German, and he was the first professional literary translator into Finnish. Two well-known English-language works that he translated were Lew Wallace's Ben-Hur (Ben-Hur: kertomus Kristuksen ajoilta), and Harriet Beecher Stowe's Uncle Tom's Cabin (Setä Tuomon tupa)

On 1 June 1882, he married Alma Erika Henriette Bonsdorff (1851-1937), from Jokioinen, the daughter of Erik Napoleon Bonsdorff (1805-1870) and Henriette Rotkirch (1808-1851). The couple had four children, Aino (b. 1884), Toini (b. 1885), Viljo (b. 1887) and Alma (b. 1888).

Works
 1888: Kotivarkaus: kuvaus Itä-Suomesta ("Stolen home: a description of Eastern Finland"), novella. WSOY 1888, 86 pages (published under the name "Aatto S.")

Translations to Finnish
 1880: Friedrich Spielhagen, Röschen vom Hofe (1864), translated as Hovin Roosa.
 1881-1886: Zachris Topelius, Vinterqvällar ("Winter evenings", 1881), translated as Talvi-iltain tarinoita (published in sections by Söderström)
 1881: E.T.A. Hoffmann, Meister Martin der Küfner und seine Gesellen ("Martin the master cooper and his journeymen", 1818), translated as Martti mestari ja hänen kisällinsä
 1883: Anne Charlotte Edgren-Leffler, "Barnet" ("Child"), in Ur lifvet II ("From Life II", 1883), translated as "Lapsi".
 1883: Georg Weber, Die Weltgeschichte in übersichtlicher Darstellung, ("Outlines of universal history"), translated as Yleinen ihmiskunnan historia.
 1883: Conrad Ferdinand Meyer, Gustav Adolfs Page (1882), translated as Paashi Leubelfing.
 1885: Anthology of Scandinavian short stories by Bjørnstjerne Bjørnson, Jonas Lie, Alexander Kielland, Lars Dilling, Holger Drachmann, J.P. Jakobsen, Henrik Pontoppidan, August Strindberg, C.J.L. Almqvist, Anne Edgren-Leffler and Mathilda Roos, translated as Skandinaviasta Novelli-kirja
 1886-1897: Zachris Topelius, Läsning för barn ("Reading to children"), poems by Eino Tamminen and Olof Berg, translated as Lukemisia lapsille.
 1888: Otto Sjögren, Historisk läsebok för skolan och hemmet: Gamla tiden och medeltiden ("History reader for the school and home: Ancient world and Middle Ages", 1875), translated as Historiallinen lukukirja: Vanha ja Keski-aika.
 1889: Lew Wallace, novel Ben-Hur (1880), translated as Ben-Hur: kertomus Kristuksen ajoilta.
 1893: Johan Jacob Ahrenberg, Familjen på Haapakoski ("The family at Haapakoski"), translated as Haapakoskelaiset. (Haapakoski is a small town of about 9,500 people) near Lapua, Finland.)
 1893: Harriet Beecher Stowe, Uncle Tom's Cabin, translated as Setä Tuomon tupa.

References

External links 
 

Finnish writers
Finnish translators
1855 births
1898 deaths
19th-century translators
People from Sortavalsky District
Translators to Finnish
Translators from English
Translators from Swedish
Translators from German